Buzuluksky District is an administrative and municipal district (raion), one of the thirty-five in Orenburg Oblast, Russia. It is located in the west of the oblast. Its administrative center is the town of Buzuluk (which is not administratively a part of the district). Population: 31,071 (2010 Census);

Administrative and municipal status
Within the framework of administrative divisions, Buzuluksky District is one of the thirty-five in the oblast. The town of Buzuluk serves as its administrative center, despite being incorporated separately as an administrative unit with the status equal to that of the districts.

As a municipal division, the district is incorporated as Buzuluksky Municipal District. The Town of Buzuluk is incorporated separately from the district as Buzuluk Urban Okrug.

References

Notes

Sources

Districts of Orenburg Oblast
